Winston Davis (1 July 1941 – 16 October 1994) was a Jamaican cricketer. He played in six first-class matches for the Jamaican cricket team from 1963 to 1972.

See also
 List of Jamaican representative cricketers

References

External links
 

1941 births
1994 deaths
Jamaican cricketers
Jamaica cricketers
Cricketers from Kingston, Jamaica